Christoffer Bring (born 17 November 1998) is a Danish professional golfer and European Tour player. He had a successful amateur career, winning both the 2021 European Amateur and the 2021 European Amateur Team Championship.

Early life and amateur career
Bring was born Næstved and had a successful amateur career. He was runner-up at the 2015 Portuguese International Amateur and lost a playoff at the 2020 Brabazon Trophy, before winning the 2021 European Amateur, two strokes ahead of Ludvig Åberg. He shot a 20-under par 264, only a stroke away from the tournament record set by Carl Pettersson in 2000.

He was a member of the 2015 European Jacques Leglise Trophy Team at Royal Dornoch Golf Club, where his teammates in that 12 ½-12 ½ tie included Viktor Hovland and Guido Migliozzi.

Playing for Denmark he won the European Boys' Team Championship in 2015 and the European Amateur Team Championship in 2021.

Bring attended the University of Texas at Austin between 2017 and 2021, playing with the Texas Longhorns men's golf team.

Professional career
Bring turned professional in August 2021 and joined the Nordic Golf League, where he was runner-up at the 2022 GolfStar Winter Series I in Spain, behind John Axelsen.

In November 2022, he finish tied 7th at European Tour Qualifying School, earning a place on the European Tour for 2023.

Amateur wins
2015 Danish Boys Championship
2016 Mon Open
2020 Danish National Match Play Championship
2021 European Amateur

Source:

Results in major championships

CUT = missed the half-way cut

Team appearances
Amateur
Jacques Léglise Trophy (representing the continent of Europe): 2015 (tie)
Duke of York Young Champions Trophy (representing Denmark): 2015  
European Boys' Team Championship (representing Denmark): 2014, 2015 (winners), 2016
European Amateur Team Championship (representing Denmark): 2021 (winners)

See also
 2022 European Tour Qualifying School graduates

References

External links

Danish male golfers
European Tour golfers
Texas Longhorns men's golfers
Sportspeople from the Capital Region of Denmark
People from Næstved Municipality
1998 births
Living people